Jameela Alia Jamil (born 25 February 1986) is a British actress and presenter. She began her career on Channel 4, where she hosted a pop culture series in the T4 strand from 2009 until 2012. She then became the radio host of The Official Chart, and was co-host of The Official Chart Update alongside Scott Mills on BBC Radio 1. She was the first solo female presenter of the BBC Radio 1 chart show.

In 2016, Jamil relocated to the United States. She played Tahani Al-Jamil in the NBC fantasy comedy series The Good Place. She is also the host of the TBS late night game show in The Misery Index and as one of the judges of voguing reality competition show Legendary. In 2022, Jamil worked on two superhero projects: the animated film DC League of Super-Pets and the Marvel Cinematic Universe television series She-Hulk: Attorney at Law.

Early life
Jamil was born on 25 February 1986 in Hampstead, London, to an Indian father, Ali Jamil, and a Pakistani-British mother, Shireen Jamil. She stated in 2015 that as a child, she faced a plethora of health problems; being born with congenital hearing loss and labyrinthitis for which she says she has had several operations to correct, and that she had 70% hearing ability in her left ear and 50% in her right ear. She has stated that aged nine she was diagnosed with hypermobile Ehlers-Danlos syndrome, a genetic disorder affecting the connective tissue in the body, and was diagnosed with coeliac disease at age 12. She has also stated that she experienced mercury poisoning at age 21, which she attributes to mercury leakage from amalgam teeth fillings, and further exacerbated by the improper removal of them, which she says burned holes in her digestive system.

She has stated that she suffered as a teenager from anorexia nervosa, and describes not eating a full meal between the ages of 14 and 17. She believes her eating disorder developed due to societal pressure, including magazine articles selling weight loss products. She states that at age 17 she was struck by a car while running from a bee, breaking several bones and damaging her spine. She describes being told that she might never walk again, but slowly recovering after steroid treatment and physiotherapy, using a Zimmer frame to start walking. She credits the car accident for pushing her towards recovery from anorexia, saying it changed her relationship with her body. She attended Queen's College School in London but was unable to complete her A-Levels, citing the accident. She has stated she then taught English to foreign students at the Callan School of English in London for two years. In a 2013 interview with The Independent, she said she worked as a model scout but never as a model, although in 2020, she stated she worked as a model but denied being one in early interviews. She also describes having worked as a photographer, scout and model agent for Premier Model Management.

Career

2009–2015: Early media career

Jamil stated in an NPR interview that she was working as a teacher when she was discovered by a producer at a bar and asked to audition as a presenter. She also said she applied to be a presenter via email after seeing a T4 (youth slot of British free-to-air Channel 4) job advertisement. Jamil appeared on Music Zone on E4, the youth channel owned by Channel Four, towards the end of 2008. She then began presenting at Channel 4's youth slot T4 in 2009. In January 2009, when the previous presenter Alexa Chung left the morning TV show Freshly Squeezed, Jamil succeeded her as co-host, alongside Nick Grimshaw. In 2010, Jamil presented The Closet, an online fashion advice show on the social networking site Bebo produced by Twenty Twenty.

Jamil also started working as an event DJ in 2010. She has stated that her first show was at Elton John's birthday party, where she says she was invited to DJ because she lied about having prior experience. In subsequent interviews and social media, she stated that she worked as a DJ for eight years, after studying music for six years on a music scholarship.

From 2011 to 2014 she wrote a column for Company, the women's monthly magazine. In January 2012, Jamil replaced June Sarpong as the host of the reality show Playing It Straight, in which a group of gay men lie about their sexuality and compete with a group of straight men for a woman's affections in order to try to win money. In June 2012, Jamil collaborated with Very to debut her first fashion collection. At the end of 2012 Jamil became the radio host of The Official Chart, and was co-host of The Official Chart Update alongside Scott Mills on BBC Radio 1. Jamil made radio history, becoming the first sole female presenter of the BBC Radio 1 Chart show.

2016–present: Transition into acting

Jamil left London in 2016 and moved to Los Angeles. She recounts having no plans of acting, and that she instead intended to work as a screenwriter. While working as a writer at 3 Arts, her agents told her that Michael Schur, who co-created Parks and Recreation, was looking for a British actress for a new upcoming comedy series. Having no prior acting experience at this point, she went for the audition and told the casting director that she had stage acting experience. She was later recalled for a second interview with Mike Schur and all of the producers, in which she claimed to have comedy improv experience. She was eventually given the role.

The show premiered in September 2016, with Jamil being a regular cast member of the NBC fantasy comedy series The Good Place, where she played Tahani Al-Jamil. Jamil's character became known for her tendency to name drop.

Jamil made her first American magazine cover on the February 2018 issue of The Cut. She provided her voice as a guest on the animated television series DuckTales. In the same year, Jamil hosted a recurring segment on Last Call with Carson Daly during its final season, entitled "Wide Awake with Jameela Jamil".

Jamil's boyfriend, musician James Blake, stated that Jamil contributed to the production of his fourth album, Assume Form, in 2017–2018; she is credited as an additional producer to five songs on the album.

Since 2019, Jamil has been the host of The Misery Index, a comedy game show on TBS.

In 2018, Jamil joined the cast of Disney's Indian-inspired cartoon set in fictional Jalpur. Mira, Royal Detective debuted in March 2020, with Jamil playing Mira's Auntie Pushpa.

In March 2020, she posed fully-clothed in suit and tie for Playboy magazine's "On Speech" issue. She later tweeted, "From my Playboy shoot, I wanted to be shot like a man. No retouching, hi res, loose, comfortable clothes and completely unsexualized. I felt extremely free."

In April 2020, she debuted her podcast I Weigh with Jameela Jamil, which focuses on women's accomplishments, body positivity, activism and racial inclusivity. In October 2020, the podcast was nominated for an E! People's Choice Award.

In June 2021, Jamil was cast as the supervillain Mary MacPherran / Titania in the Disney+ streaming series She-Hulk: Attorney at Law (2022), set in the Marvel Cinematic Universe. Also in 2022, she voiced Wonder Woman in the animated film DC League of Super-Pets.

In 2021, Jamil contributed to the production of James Blake's fifth album Friends That Break Your Heart, adding additional production to the albums first single, "Say What You Will".

Activism
Late in 2015, Jamil launched Why Not People?, an events and membership company dedicated to hosting live entertainment events accessible to people with disabilities. In March 2018, Jamil created an Instagram account called I Weigh, inspired by a picture that she came across online of Kourtney, Kim and Khloé Kardashian with their half-sisters Kendall and Kylie Jenner, detailing each woman's weight. Jamil describes I Weigh as "a movement... for us to feel valuable and see how amazing we are, and look past the flesh on our bones". The account welcomes submissions of followers' non-edited or airbrushed selfies using the hashtag #iweigh, with text describing the things that they feel grateful for or proud of. In part due to this work, Jamil was listed as one of BBC's 100 Women during 2018.

Jamil has been a critic of diet shakes and appetite suppressants. She explained that in her teens she starved herself, took laxatives and tips from celebrities on how to maintain a low weight. She has criticised the Kardashians, rapper Cardi B, and other influencers for promoting diet suppressants via social media. Jamil created a petition via change.org, titled "Stop celebrities promoting toxic diet products on social media", with a goal of reaching 150,000 signatures. She called upon social media networks such as Facebook, Twitter, and Instagram to ban the practice, noting its dangerous rhetoric on impressionable teenagers. In September 2019, Instagram rolled out new global policy restrictions to help protect teen users.

Using social media, Jamil often calls out media industry standards and labels other female celebrities as "double agents of the patriarchy" by promoting unhealthy body image, often invoking her own experience of having an eating disorder in her arguments. In 2013, she criticised Rihanna in her column for Company magazine, blaming the artist for maintaining a relationship with her abuser for fame, smoking marijuana, and for posting "provocative images on Instagram to millions of hungry followers". In 2014, she voiced her disapproval of Beyoncé sexualising her public image like Nicki Minaj, Rihanna, Miley Cyrus, Iggy Azalea and criticised all these artists for "delud[ing] themselves into thinking it's 'feminism' if you get your fanny out on "your terms." In 2019, she called out rapper Cupcakke on Twitter for posting about doing a water fast. Jamil often calls out Kim Kardashian for promoting unhealthy body ideals, such as by wearing a corset, promoting body makeup to cover skin imperfections such as psoriasis and for offering maternity shapewear for her fashion line. In August 2020, Jamil announced on Twitter that she was deleting tweets from 2009 to 2020 in order to make her account more activism-focused. Months later in November 2020, Jamil claimed that it was a third-party app which caused her Twitter posts to disappear in the previous months, and that she had deleted her entire Twitter post history to figure out why her posts were being removed.

Jamil is against the airbrushing of editorial images and refuses to retouch all her photo shoots.

She is also critical of the fashion and modelling industry standards and remarked that runway models looked "long-starved" and "terrified". Jamil frequently references Victoria's Secret models as a counterexample to her own identity. She has also called Chanel designer Karl Lagerfeld a "ruthless, fat-phobic misogynist" after his death.

Jamil also supports the climate change movement, expressing her admiration for Jane Fonda, Greta Thunberg and several other climate change activists.

In 2023, Jamil signed an open letter expressing "serious concerns about editorial bias" in the New York Times reporting on transgender people. The letter characterized the newspaper's reporting as using "an eerily familiar mix of pseudoscience and euphemistic, charged language", and raised concerns regarding the New York Times employment practices regarding trans contributors.

Charity
Jamil appeared on C4 Orange Rockcorps 2009, volunteering to help create a concert to fund local community projects. She has supported the Cultural Learning Alliance, which promotes access to culture for children and young people, and Vinspired National Awards for people aged 16–25 who have contributed to their communities through volunteering. Jamil designed her own version of SpongeBob SquarePants to be auctioned off with all the proceeds going to Childline.
Jamil also said that she would wear a chicken costume for the same number of days equal to the number of thousands of pounds she raises for Comic Relief. She was sponsored approximately £16,000 and wore the costume for 16 consecutive days.

Honours
Jamil was one of fifteen women selected to appear on the cover of the September 2019 issue of British Vogue "Forces for Change", by guest editor Meghan, Duchess of Sussex.

On 2 August 2019, Jamil was awarded "Advocate of the Year" from the Ehlers-Danlos Society.

Jamil received the "Phenom" award from the 12th annual Shorty Awards on 3 May 2020.

Personal life
Jamil has been in a relationship with musician James Blake since 2015. She publicly declared herself as queer after her appointment as a judge of voguing reality series Legendary received heavy criticism, as voguing ball culture is rooted in Black and Latino LGBTQ communities in New York.

Jamil has also stated that she has experienced anxiety, depression and obsessive-compulsive disorder. On 10 October 2019, as part of World Mental Health Day, Jamil stated she survived a suicide attempt six years prior. In an episode of the talkshow Red Table Talk in 2020, Jamil revealed that she had also attempted suicide eight years prior due to a nervous breakdown. She also stated that she partook in EMDR therapy to treat her post traumatic stress disorder prior to her move to Los Angeles.

Filmography

Film

Television

Radio

References

Further reading
 
 
 
 Jameela explains how she got her first DJ gig, Elton John's birthday party, on Conan Conan. 5 December 2019.

External links
 

1986 births
21st-century English actresses
Actresses from London
BBC 100 Women
BBC Radio 1 presenters
British people of Pakistani descent
English expatriates in the United States
English female models
English feminists
English game show hosts
English television actresses
English television presenters
English voice actresses
English people of Pakistani descent
Living people
People from Hampstead
Queer actresses
Queer women
Shorty Award winners
British women radio presenters